Peter Diamond (born 1940) is an American economist.

Peter Diamond may also refer to:

 Peter Diamond (actor) (1929–2004), British actor
 Peter Diamond, a fictional British police detective in a series of novels by Peter Lovesey

See also 
 Peter Diamand (1913–1998), arts administrator